Sonia Vesga Ruiz, also known as Sonia Burgos in allusion to her birthplace, is a Spanish football midfielder, currently playing for Rayo Vallecano in Primera División.

She was a member of the Spain women's national football team.

Titles
 3 Spanish Leagues (2009, 2010, 2011)

References

1980 births
Living people
Spanish women's footballers
Spain women's international footballers
Primera División (women) players
Rayo Vallecano Femenino players
Atlético Madrid Femenino players
Women's association football fullbacks
Women's association football midfielders